Randall "Randy" Zisk is an American television director and producer. He graduated from the University of Southern California and is a native of Dallas, Texas, where he graduated from St. Mark's School of Texas. His brother, Craig Zisk, also works in television. As both a director and producer, he has worked most substantially on the television series Lois & Clark: The New Adventures of Superman and Monk. He also wrote the 2006 film Maybe It's in the Water, and two episodes of Midnight Caller.

Zisk was nominated for an Primetime Emmy Award, in 2005.

Directing credits
Lois & Clark: The New Adventures of Superman (6 episodes, 1993–1995)
NYPD Blue (2 episodes, 1996–1997)
Early Edition (3 episodes, 1996–1998)
Chicago Hope (1 episode, 1997)
Providence (3 episodes, 1999–2002)
Felicity (1 episode, 2000)
Strong Medicine (1 episode, 2001)
American Dreams (4 episodes, 2002–2004)
Without a Trace (6 episodes, 2002–2006)
Monk (34 episodes, 2002–2009)
John Doe (1 episode, 2003)
Miss Match (1 episode, 2003)
House M.D. (1 episode, 2005)
Prison Break (1 episode, 2005)
Desperate Housewives (3 episodes, 2006–2012)
Weeds (1 episode, 2007)
Grey's Anatomy (4 episodes, 2007–2010)
Memphis Beat (2 episodes, 2010–2011)
The Glades (3 episodes, 2010–2013)
Off the Map (5 episodes, 2011)
Rizzoli & Isles (5 episodes, 2011–2014)
The Mentalist (8 episodes, 2011–2014)
Private Practice (1 episode, 2011)
Suburgatory (2 episodes, 2011–2014)
GCB (1 episode, 2012)
Dallas (3 episodes, 2012–2013)
Revenge (3 episodes, 2012–2013)
The Mob Doctor (1 episode, 2012)
Scandal (6 episodes, 2013–2015)
We Are Men (1 episode, 2013)
Save Me (1 episode, 2013)
Family Tools (1 episode, 2013)
The Blacklist (1 episode, 2014)
Reckless (1 episode, 2014)
How to Get Away with Murder (1 episode, 2014)
Madam Secretary (1 episode, 2014)
Backstrom (1 episode, 2015)
The Mysteries of Laura (2 episodes, 2015)
Battle Creek (1 episode, 2015)
Bones (7 episodes, 2015–2017)
Girlfriends' Guide to Divorce (1 episode, 2015)
NCIS: New Orleans (1 episode, 2017)
Valor (1 episode, 2017)
Code Black (1 episode, 2018)
The Good Cop (3 episodes, 2018)
Bull (1 episode, 2018)
The Fix (1 episode, 2019)
What/If (1 episode, 2019)
In the Dark (1 episode, 2019)
Instinct (1 episode, 2019)
Almost Family (2 episodes, 2019–2020)
The Equalizer (5 episodes, 2021-2022)
Good Sam (1 episode, 2022)
The Endgame (1 episode, 2022)
So Help Me Todd (1 episode, 2022)
East New York (1 episode, 2023)

Producer
Lois & Clark: The New Adventures of Superman (21 episodes, 1995–1996) (co-executive producer)
Monk (97 episodes, 2002–2009) (executive producer), (16 episodes, 2003–2004) (co-executive producer)
The Good Cop (2018) (executive producer)

See also
Notable alumni of St. Mark's School of Texas

References

External links

American television directors
Television producers from Texas
Living people
University of Southern California alumni
Place of birth missing (living people)
Year of birth missing (living people)
People from Dallas
St. Mark's School (Texas) alumni